Nuorgam is a village in the Utsjoki municipality in the region of Lapland, Finland. It has approximately 200 inhabitants. It is the northernmost point of Finland and the northernmost point of the European Union.

It is situated on the Deatnu river, which is very popular for salmon fishing. Nuorgam is located near the villages of Utsjoki and Tana. The nearest cities are Murmansk, Rovaniemi, Hammerfest, Alta and Tromsø.

History 
The origin of the name Njuorggán is unclear. Nuorgam is a Finnish adaptation of the original Northern Sámi name.

The first settler in the area originated from Buolbmát in Norway, arriving in the area in the late 18th century. The surname Nuorgam, used since the 1770s (Niorkam), originates from the village.

References

External links 

Villages in Finland
Utsjoki